McFarland may refer to:

People
McFarland (surname)

Places in the United States
McFarland, California, a city
McFarland, Kansas, a city
McFarland, Missouri, a ghost town
McFarland, Wisconsin, a village

Other uses
USS McFarland (DD-237), a US Navy destroyer
McFarland, USA, a 2015 sports drama film
McFarland & Company, a publisher of nonfiction and academic books
McFarland Mall, a shopping center in Tuscaloosa, Alabama
McFarland standards, a scale for the measurement of turbidity in bacterial suspensions

See also
MacFarland
McFarlan (disambiguation)
McFarlane (disambiguation)
Justice McFarland (disambiguation)